Gradually Going Tornado is the third solo album by drummer Bill Bruford and second and final album by his group Bruford. It was co-produced by Bruford and Ron Malo, the latter known from his work with Weather Report. The music on the album leans closer to progressive rock than the jazz fusion oriented sound of the band’s previous albums. More of Bruford's lyrics are featured as well, for the first time sung by bassist Jeff Berlin.
"Land's End" incorporates music keyboardist Dave Stewart has previously composed for the National Health album Of Queues and Cures (1978). Guitarist Allan Holdsworth does not appear, and he recommended John Clark as his replacement in the band after he had given Clark several guitar lessons. Clark was listed on the album sleeve as "the unknown John Clark" as part of a running joke related to his relative obscurity in comparison to his predecessor.

The title of the album was taken from the British-based Romanian artist Paul Neagu who did a performance under the name "Gradually Going Tornado" in London in 1974. Neagu created the album's cover art.

Reception

In a review for AllMusic, Lee Bloom wrote: "This is intelligent fusion -- intricately crafted, high energy, and technically impressive... Gradually Going Tornado, if not Bruford's most successful effort, is certainly among the finest music produced in the progressive rock/fusion genre."

The authors of The Penguin Guide to Jazz Recordings called the music "strongly melodic, freewheeling and built round Bruford's ringing percussion."

John Kelman of All About Jazz commented: "The Bruford Tapes demonstrated a more raucous energy than Bruford's first two releases, but the follow-up studio album, Gradually Going Tornado, proved that the group was capable of generating the same kind of power in the studio."

Progrography's Dave Connolly remarked: "Bruford's contributions are primarily those of a composer, architecting rhythmically complex arrangements for the rest of the band to play while he assumes the role of musical straight man on the drums.... Bruford no longer feels derivative of other artists. Here, he's borrowing from himself... and the result casts his other musical contributions into a better light."

Track listing 
 "Age of Information" (Bruford, Stewart) – 4:41
 "Gothic 17" (Bruford, Stewart) – 5:07
 "Joe Frazier" (Berlin) – 4:41
 "Q.E.D." (Bruford, Stewart) – 7:46
 "The Sliding Floor" (Berlin, Bruford, Stewart) – 4:58
 "Palewell Park" (Bruford) – 3:57
 "Plans for J.D." (Bruford) – 3:50
 "Land's End" (Stewart) – 10:20

2005 bonus cut
9. "5G" [live] (Berlin, Bruford, Stewart) – 7:21

Personnel 

 Dave Stewart – keyboards, synthesizers
 John Clark – electric guitar
 Jeff Berlin – bass guitar, lead vocals
 Bill Bruford – drums, piano (“Palewell Park”)

Guests:
 Georgie Born – cello (“Gothic 17”)
 Amanda Parsons, Barbara Gaskin – backing vocals (“Land’s End”)

Technical:
 Ron Malo – co-producer, engineer
 Pete Buhlman – engineer, tape operator
 Martin Moss – engineer, second engineer
 Paul Neagu – art direction, design

Charts 
Album - Billboard (United States)

References 

Bill Bruford albums
1980 albums
Polydor Records albums